Celestia is a real-time 3D astronomy software program that was created in 2001 by Chris Laurel. The program allows users to virtually travel through the universe and explore celestial objects that have been catalogued. Celestia also doubles as a planetarium, but the user is not restricted to the Earth's surface, like in other planetarium software such as Stellarium. To summarize, Celestia is a scientifically accurate 3D universe simulator, that is also highly customizable. Celestia can display objects of various scales using OpenGL.

Celestia is available for AmigaOS 4, Linux, macOS, Microsoft Windows, iOS, and Android. It is free and open source software released under the GNU General Public License.

Celestia's development stopped in 2013, with the final release in 2011. Since then, some of its development team went to work on celestia.Sci, a cosmological visualizer featuring more realistic rendering of galaxies and planets, gravitational lensing, and many other scientifically accurate enhancements. However, since the Celestial Matters forums went down in 2020, there have been no updates on the progress of the program. The original creator of Celestia, Chris Laurel, created Fifth Star Labs after Celestia's development stopped, and started work on the widely-used iOS app Sky Guide. In late 2016, the official Celestia forums were restored, and development restarted. As of 2020 beta testing builds of version 1.7.0 are available, as well as the bugfix release 1.6.2. Celestia was ported to mobile devices in 2020, and it continues to receive updates and experimental beta versions. As of 2021, there is a project on the main Celestia GitHub repository titled Release 1.6.3, but it hasn't been updated in over a year. If 1.6.3 were to be released, it would consist of a major data update, likely backported mostly from 1.7.0.

Celestia is available for download from its main website, celestia.space, but it can be obtained from a large multitude of free software websites as well. Between 2001 and May 2017, the former central distribution site SourceForge counted approximately 12 million downloads.

Functions

Celestia versions 1.6.2.2 and under display the Hipparcos Catalogue (HIP) of 118,322 stars and a compiled catalogue of galaxies, while version 1.7.0 includes stars from the Tycho-2 Catalogue alongside the Hipparcos stars, with some data from Gaia, increasing the star count to over 2 million. Celestia uses the VSOP87 theory of planetary orbits to provide a solar and lunar eclipse finder and to display the orbital paths of planets (including extrasolar planets), dwarf planets, moons, asteroids, comets, artificial satellites, and spacecraft.

Using the installed catalogues, the names of celestial objects can be displayed, including artificial satellites. The names and locations of Earth features such as continents, mountains, seas, oceans, and cities can also be displayed. Surface features on other celestial objects such as craters, basins and canyons can be shown as well.

Celestia allows users to navigate at different speeds, and allow users to orbit stars, planets, moons, and other space objects, track space objects such as spacecraft, asteroids, and comets as they fly by, or travel to and/or fly through galaxies. Light time delay is an optional function.

The time simulated by Celestia can be set to any time 2 billion years forward or backward from the present, although planetary orbits are only accurate within a few thousand years of the present day, and 

Celestia simulates the appearance of atmospheres on planets and moons, planetshine on orbiting satellites, and miscellaneous planetary details such as sunrise and sunset. Information about the objects that Celestia draws can also be displayed, such as temperature, distance from observer, radius, rotational period, luminosity, and more.

The user can change Celestia's field of view, and the window can be split into multiple different panes, meaning that several objects can be displayed on the screen at once. Screenshots and movies can be captured in classic or HD resolutions. Celestia's support for gamepads and joysticks is relatively limited.

Celestia can be extended with new objects, and has support for third-party, user-created add-ons available for installation, both fictional and realistic. These files are plain text files that are written like code and have specific syntax rules that have to be followed for Celestia to read them, and there are dozens of different use cases and ways to write these files. Celestia also uses custom CEL and CELX scripts written in the powerful Lua programming language which can execute a multitude of functions.

Limitations

The default setting for Celestia's Earth is a spheroid. The irregular surface of the Earth causes low Earth orbit satellites to appear to be in the wrong places in the sky when watched from the surface, even when the Earth's oblateness is specified.

Many types of astronomical objects are not included with Celestia. Variable stars, supernovae, black holes, and nebulae are missing from the standard distribution. Many of these are available as add-ons.

Although objects that form part of a planetary system move, and stars rotate about their axes and orbit each other in multiple star systems, stellar proper motion is not simulated, and galaxies are at fixed locations. As a result, the constellations in Celestia do not gradually change shape as they do in the real world. In addition, Celestia's binary star catalogs only describe a few hundred systems of multiple stars. Most binary star systems cannot be simulated with 100% accuracy because adequate orbital information is not yet available.

Celestia does not include any stars that are more than a few thousand light-years from the Sun because the parallaxes of more distant stars are too small to be accurately measured by the Hipparcos astrometric satellite. However, with the addition of Gaia data in 1.7.0, stars as far away as the Galactic Center are included. In addition, objects in star systems are only drawn to a distance of one light-year from their parent stars, any further and they will not be rendered at all. Similarly, there is a render limit for stars at 10 million light-years in 1.6.2.2 and under, increased to 1 billion light-years in 1.7.0. Any stars beyond that limit are not rendered, and stars that are close to the 1.7.0 render limit experience floating point errors. Finally, Celestia does not consider the wobbling of some stars induced by their planets, unless said wobbling is very noticeable.

Wavelength filtering is not implemented in Celestia's engine. The actual rendering tries to match human vision at the observer's position as accurately as possible. This means false-color maps and multi-color nebulae are not part of the official distribution, but some are available as add-ons. Camera artifacts such as lens flare and glare are not rendered.

Celestia also does not simulate gravity. For example, a near-Earth object approaching the Earth will not be deflected by the Earth's gravity unless the person who defined the NEO's trajectory for Celestia included that effect.

Some moons do not cast shadows on their planet during eclipses. This is because irregularly shaped objects do not cast shadows in the current version of Celestia, although this is planned for future versions. Additionally, moons smaller than 0.5% of their parent objects' size do not cast shadows at all, as "these shadows aren't likely to be relevant", but the removal of this feature has been considered.

Most real-world spacecraft such as Voyager 2 are not available in Celestia but are provided as add-ons by users. Additionally, most of the spacecraft included with standard Celestia use outdated or low-quality models, such as the stock Mir which uses extremely low-quality textures and models, and the stock ISS which hasn't had an update since around 2007, but there are add-ons on the Celestia Forums which add more accurate and higher-quality models. However, there has recently been work done to add higher-quality, more up-to-date models into standard 1.7.0.

Celestia uses the Julian calendar and cannot go back or forward more than 2 billion years, and the default time-setting system cannot go further than the years -9999 or 9999.

Add-ons

Well over 80 GB of extensions are available in addition to the base program, produced by an active user community.

Higher resolution surface textures are available for most Solar System bodies, including Virtual Textures with coverage up to 32768 pixels wide (1.25 km/pixel at the Earth's equator), with selected coverage at higher resolutions. This allows closer views of well-mapped objects that have high-resolution VTs available for download. 3D models of historical and existing spacecraft are available flying in reasonably accurate trajectories, such as Sputnik 1, Voyager 2, the Hubble Space Telescope, and the International Space Station, as are extended data plots for stars (2 million with correct spatial coordinates), DSOs (nebulae, galaxies, open clusters, etc.), as well as catalogs of asteroids and comets, and more than 96,000 locations on the Earth can be drawn by the program. Add-ons also include other objects such as red and blue supergiants, red and brown dwarfs, neutron stars, spinning pulsars, rotating black holes with accretion disks, protostars, Wolf-Rayet stars, star nursery nebulae, supernova remnants, planetary nebulae, galactic redshifts, geological planetary displays (e.g. 3D interiors, topographic and bathymetric maps, paleogeography), planetary aurorae, rotating magnetic fields, animated solar prominences, 3D craters and mountains, and historic collision events (Either spacecraft such as Deep Impact and DART, or meteoric impacts such as the Chelyabinsk meteor).

Numerous scripts are available. These include simple tours, reconstructions of complex space missions such as Cassini–Huygens and Deep Impact, and scripts showing useful information, like size comparisons, or particular events such as multiple simultaneous eclipses of Jupiter's moons or the evolution of a star.

Fictional universes can be depicted, with planetary systems and 3D models—films such as 2001: A Space Odyssey, Star Trek and Star Wars, and TV shows including Stargate SG-1 and Babylon 5. Add-ons illustrating less well-known internet fiction, like Orion's Arm, or role-playing games, like 2300 AD, and personal works by members of the Celestia community depicting fictional planetary systems with inhabited worlds, spacecraft, cities, and special effects can also be added.

Educational add-ons can also be implemented in different languages. These activities provide approximately 40 hours of space journeys and astronomical lessons to include extensive tours of the Celestia universe, the complete life cycle of stars, the Solar System, the human space program, the Search for Extraterrestrial Intelligence (SETI), and depictions of astronomical events such as the formation of the Moon billions of years ago, and the possible terraforming of Mars in the future.

In mid 2016, a large addon pack project called Celestia Origin was created, which replaces all vanilla textures and graphics with higher-quality renderings, adds more minor objects such as TNOs and asteroids, while also adding more extrasolar planets with custom textures, more nebulae with full 3D and accurate models, more stars and galaxies, more star clusters, more spacecraft, and a ton of more enhancements. In 2019, Celestia Forum member FarGetaNik created an addon pack called Project Echoes, featuring higher-quality renderings that replace all vanilla textures. Celestia 1.7 appears to use Project Echoes as inspiration for its textures.

Uses in media
NASA and ESA have used Celestia in their educational and outreach programs, as well as for interfacing to trajectory analysis software. The French Space Agency (CNES) created a heavily modified version of Celestia in 2016, called VTS Timeloop, and it has since been used by multiple space agencies, including ESA and CNES themselves.

Celestia was used in the media by the CBS television show NCIS (Season 4, Episode 22: "In the Dark"). Character Timothy McGee explains what Celestia is and how an add-on can allow the user to store a diary within the program, as well. Textures designed by Celestia graphic artists were used in the movie The Day After Tomorrow and the 2008 miniseries The Andromeda Strain. Celestia has also appeared on the Science Channel's Through the Wormhole. Eurogamer's Jim Rossignol named Celestia among a top 20 list of Summer of PC Freeware games in 2006.

See also

SpaceEngine
OpenUniverse
Space flight simulation game
List of space flight simulation games
Planetarium software
List of observatory software
Gravity (software)

Notes

References

External links

 
 GitHub repository Current binaries and source code
 Celestia Archive Repository Archive of Windows, macOS, and Linux binaries
 Official Forums
 Instance of ESA using Celestia
 Celestia.Mobi main site

2001 software
Free astronomy software
Planetarium technology
Astronomy software
Free educational software
Planetarium software for Linux
Science software that uses GTK
AmigaOS 4 software
Science software for macOS
Science software for Windows
Educational software for macOS
Educational software for Windows
Cross-platform free software
Lua (programming language)-scriptable software
Portable software
Freeware